Kivimäe (Estonian for "Stone Hill") is a subdistrict in the district of Nõmme, Tallinn, the capital of Estonia.

Kivimäe has a station on the Elron western route.

Gallery

References

Subdistricts of Tallinn